Jordan Miles Hunter (born 30 January 1997) is an Australian professional basketball player for the Sydney Kings of the National Basketball League (NBL). He played college basketball for the Saint Mary's Gaels.

Early life
Hunter attended Saint Ignatius' College in Sydney, New South Wales.

In 2015, Hunter attended the BA Centre of Excellence in Canberra and played for the program's SEABL team.

College career
Between 2015 and 2019, Hunter played college basketball in the United States for the Saint Mary's Gaels. He was used sparingly over his first three seasons before seeing his minutes more than triple from his junior season to his senior season. As a senior in 2018–19, he averaged 7.9 points, 6.7 rebounds, 1.0 assists and 1.4 blocks, as he started all 34 games and averaged 23.3 minutes per game. He was named the 2019 WCC tournament MVP and was named to the WCC's All-Academic Team.

Professional career
Hunter joined the Sydney Kings of the National Basketball League for the 2019–20 season. He played 27 games in his rookie season and helped the Kings to a grand final berth.

After a stint with the Norths Bears in the Waratah League in 2020, Hunter returned to the Kings for the 2020–21 NBL season and finished runner-up for NBL Most Improved Player. He led the Kings in total rebounds with 227 at 6.3 per game, playing 36 games including 33 starts.

The 2021 off-season saw Hunter sustain a finger fracture and then a season-ending navicular fracture. He missed the entire 2021–22 NBL season, as the Kings won the 2022 NBL championship.

After playing for the North Gold Coast Seahawks in the 2022 NBL1 North season, Hunter made his return for the Kings in the 2022–23 NBL season.

References

External links
NBL profile
Saint Mary's Gaels bio

1997 births
Living people
Australian men's basketball players
Centers (basketball)
Saint Mary's Gaels men's basketball players
Sydney Kings players